WVC Dinamo Moscow is a Russian women's volleyball club based in Moscow which is currently playing in the Super League. It was established in 1926 and dissolved in 1992, but was reestablished in 2004. It is the most successful team in Soviet women's volleyball history with fourteen Championship titles and the most successful team in the CEV Women's Champions League history with eleven titles.

History

Soviet years
The club was created in 1926, when Dinamo Moscow decided to establish a women's volleyball section from its sports club. Its first participation in the USSR Championship was 1940, finishing in seventh place. The championship was not held from 1941 until 1944 due to war, but once it resumed in 1945 the club began achieving success under the coach Nikolay Nikolaevich Benderov, winning the titles in 1947, 1951, 1953, 1954 and 1955. During that period the club also won the USSR Cups of 1950, 1951 and 1953.

From 1957 to 1965 the club had a new coach, Serafima Georgievna Kundirenko who took the team to winning the USSR Championships of 1960 and 1962. The introduction of the new premier club competition with clubs from Europe called European Cup (today known as CEV Champions League), provided an opportunity for the club to compete against teams from across the continent. Dynamo Moscow won the inaugural 1960–61 edition, as well as the 1962–63 and 1964–65 editions, establishing itself as one of the strongest women's volleyball clubs in Europe. In 1966, under Anatoly Sergeyevich Sarkisov the team won the 1967–68 European Cup.

Givi Alexandrovich Akhvlediani became the new coach in 1969, with the goal of making Dynamo Moscow the country's leading team. Under his guidance, Dynamo Moscow brought new players (Nina Smoleyeva, Rosa Salikhova, Antonina Ryzhova, Tatyana Tretyakova, Larisa Bergen, Nina Muradyan), employed new tactics and focused on improving technical skills. That lead the club to its most successful period, winning six USSR Championships (1970, 1971, 1972, 1973, 1975, 1977) and seven European Cups (1968–69, 1969–70, 1970–71, 1971–72, 1973–74, 1974–75, 1976–77), making Dynamo Moscow the dominant force in European women's volleyball during the late 60's and 1970's.

The next head coach was Mikhail Omelchenko. By the 1980s Uralochka began to emerge itself as a dominant force, and Dynamo's winning generation team of the 1970s was ageing. Omelchenko rejuvenated the squad calling new players (Lyubov Kozyreva, Nataliya Razumova) who helped the club to win the USSR Cup in 1982 and the USSR Championship in 1983. After social and political changes in the USSR, the club could no longer perform at the highest level being relegated at the conclusion of the 1988–89 season. The club kept on playing in the second division for another three seasons and decided to stop its women's volleyball activities in 1992.

Russian years
After a 12-year break, the club was re-established on 12 May 2004. It entered the Super League in the 2004–05 season and the team proved to be competitive right away, finishing second that year. The success came shortly after the club won the league in the following two seasons (2005–06 and 2006–07) and a third time in 2008–09. Since then, they won four times the Russian Cup (2009, 2011, 2013 and 2018) in the same time they won the Super League in 2015–16, 2016–17, 2017–18, 2018–19.

The club is yet to emulate the Soviet era success in Europe, but it has reached the finals of the CEV Cup (in 2005–06) and the CEV Champions League twice (in 2006–07 and in 2008–09).

Honours

National competitions
USSR
  USSR Championship : 14 
1947, 1951, 1953, 1954, 1955, 1960, 1962, 1970, 1971, 1972, 1973, 1975, 1977, 1983

  USSR Cup: 4 
1950, 1951, 1953, 1982

Russia
  Russian Super League: 7
2005–06, 2006–07, 2008–09, 2015–16, 2016–17, 2017-18, 2018–19

  Russian Cup: 4 
2009, 2011, 2013, 2018

 Russian Super Cup: 2
2017, 2018

International competitions
  CEV Champions League: 11
1960–61, 1962–63, 1964–65, 1967–68, 1968–69, 1969–70, 1970–71, 1971–72, 1973–74, 1974–75, 1976–77

Team roster
Season 2022–2023, as of June 2022.

Notable players

  Larisa Bergen
  Lyudmila Buldakova
  Aleksandra Chudina
  Marita Katusheva
  Irina Kirillova
  Liliya Konovalova
  Lyubov Kozyreva
  Tatyana Kraynova
  Nina Muradyan
  Nataliya Razumova
  Antonina Ryzhova
  Rosa Salikhova
  Lyudmila Shchetinina
  Nina Smoleyeva
  Tatyana Tretyakova
  Zoya Yusova
  Ekaterina Gamova
  Elena Godina
  Nataliya Goncharova
  Tatiana Kosheleva
  Svetlana Kryuchkova
  Yulia Merkulova
  Maria Perepelkina
  Natalia Safronova
  Irina Tebenikhina
  Anastasiya Kodirova
  Tatiana Gratcheva
  Marina Sheshenina
  Maria Borodakova
  Lesya Makhno
  Anna Podkopaeva
  Irina Fetisova
  Evgeniya Startseva
  Oksana Parkhomenko
  Fernanda Garay
  Natalia Pereira
  Nataša Osmokrović
  Maja Poljak
  Sanja Popovic
  Yaima Ortiz
  Angelina Grün
  Carolina Costagrande
  Simona Gioli
  Bethania de la Cruz
  Logan Tom
  Maja Ognjenović
  Helena Havelkova
  Elitsa Vasileva

References

External links
Official website

Volleyball
Russian volleyball clubs
Volleyball clubs established in 1926
1926 establishments in Russia
Women in Moscow